In mathematics, a real-valued function is a function whose values are real numbers.  In other words, it is a function that assigns a real number to each member of its domain.

Real-valued functions of a real variable (commonly called real functions) and real-valued functions of several real variables are the main object of study of calculus and, more generally, real analysis. In particular, many function spaces consist of real-valued functions.

Algebraic structure 
Let  be the set of all functions from a set  to real numbers . Because  is a field,  may be turned into a vector space and a commutative algebra over the reals with the following operations:
 – vector addition
 – additive identity
 – scalar multiplication
 – pointwise multiplication

Also, since  is an ordered set, there is a partial order

Measurable 

The σ-algebra of Borel sets is an important structure on real numbers. If  has its σ-algebra and a function  is such that the preimage  of any Borel set  belongs to that σ-algebra, then  is said to be measurable.

Moreover, a set (family) of real-valued functions on  can actually define a σ-algebra on  generated by all preimages of all Borel sets (or of intervals only, it is not important). This is the way how σ-algebras arise in (Kolmogorov's) probability theory, where real-valued functions on the sample space  are real-valued random variables.

Continuous 
Real numbers form a topological space and a complete metric space. Continuous real-valued functions (which implies that  is a topological space) are important in theories of topological spaces and of metric spaces. The extreme value theorem states that for any real continuous function on a compact space its global maximum and minimum exist.

The concept of metric space itself is defined with a real-valued function of two variables, the metric, which is continuous. The space of continuous functions on a compact Hausdorff space has a particular importance. Convergent sequences also can be considered as real-valued continuous functions on a special topological space.

Smooth 

Real numbers are used as the codomain to define smooth functions. A domain of a real smooth function can be the real coordinate space (which yields a real multivariable function), a topological vector space, an open subset of them, or a smooth manifold.

Appearances in measure theory 
A measure on a set is a non-negative real-valued functional on a σ-algebra of subsets. Lp spaces on sets with a measure are defined from aforementioned real-valued measurable functions, although they are actually quotient spaces. Each of Lp spaces is a vector space and have a partial order, and there exists a pointwise multiplication of "functions" which changes , namely

For example, pointwise product of two L2 functions belongs to L1.

Other appearances 
Other contexts where real-valued functions and their special properties are used include monotonic functions (on ordered sets), convex functions (on vector and affine spaces), harmonic and subharmonic functions (on Riemannian manifolds), analytic functions (usually of one or more real variables), algebraic functions (on real algebraic varieties), and polynomials (of one or more real variables).

See also
 Real analysis
 Partial differential equations, a major user of real-valued functions
 Norm (mathematics)
 Scalar (mathematics)

Footnotes

References
 
 Gerald Folland, Real Analysis: Modern Techniques and Their Applications, Second Edition, John Wiley & Sons, Inc., 1999, .

External links

Mathematical analysis
Types of functions
General topology
Metric geometry
Vector spaces
Measure theory